Syed Hussain (born 16 July 1922) is an Indian former politician who was Member of Parliament Rajya Sabha, and Chairman of the Legislative Council of Jammu and Kashmir.

Hussain was born on 16 July 1922, in ancestral house in Mohalla Mir Maidan in Dooru—Near Verinag, District Anantnag. He holds a Bachelor of Arts [BA] (Kashmir University); Bachelor of Law [LLB]  (Aligarh Muslim University); Mufti  (Honours; in Persian and Arabic) Kashmir University

Hussain married Farkhundah Begum on 1 October 1940; they have four daughters.

Hussain is an advocate; was associated with Jammu and Kashmir National Conference from early student days; was arrested after sustaining serious injuries while leading a demonstration against autocratic rule in the state in 1946; took leading part in organizing popular resistance against Pak-invaders and infiltrators in 1947 and 1965 respectively; one of the founders of Democratic National Conference;

Hussain has been the member of:
 Executive Committee J&K Pradesh Congress.
 Congress Forum for Socialist action.
 Executive Committee of J &K, Unit of I.S.C.U.S  and
 Central Citizen Committee;
 Debt Conciliation Board, 1949, 1950 and 1951;
 Legislative Assembly, Jammu and Kashmir, 1957 until 1962  and was elected to the J&K Legislative Council in 1962;
 Public Accounts Committee and Committee on Subordinate Legislation in J & K, Legislature
 Member Committee on Subordinate Legislation of the Rajya Sabha;
 Rajya Sabha from 16 April 1968 to 5 March 1974.

In 1975, he resigned as the chairman of the Legislative Council after his party lost its majority in the Council following assumption of Chief Ministership by Sheikh Abdullah.

References 

1922 births
Possibly living people
Rajya Sabha members from Jammu and Kashmir
Chairs of the Jammu and Kashmir Legislative Council
People from Anantnag district
Members of the Jammu and Kashmir Legislative Council
Jammu and Kashmir MLAs 1957–1962
India MPs 1998–1999
Lok Sabha members from Jammu and Kashmir
Aligarh Muslim University alumni
Faculty of Law, Aligarh Muslim University alumni
Jammu & Kashmir National Conference politicians
University of Kashmir alumni